Avi Barot (25 June 1992 – 15 October 2021) was an Indian cricketer who played for Saurashtra. He played 38 first-class matches, 38 List A matches, and 20 Twenty20 matches during his career, including 21 matches in the Ranji Trophy, 17 List A and 11 domestic T20 matches for Saurashtra. He played as a  right-handed wicket-keeper-batsman and scored 1,547 runs, 1,030 runs and 717 runs in first-class, List-A and T20 respectively.

Barot died on 15 October 2021 in Ahmedabad, from a cardiac arrest. He was 29.

References

External links
 

1992 births
2021 deaths
Indian cricketers
Haryana cricketers
Saurashtra cricketers
Cricketers from Ahmedabad